The 2016–17 Burundi Ligue A season, also known as Primus Ligue for sponsorship reasons, was the 54th edition of the top flight football competition in Burundi. The season began on 10 September 2016 and concluded on 21 May 2017. Vital'O were the defending champion. LLB Sport 4 Africa won its second league title.

Teams 
A total of sixteen clubs participate in this season. Thirteen teams from previous season and three new promoted sides.

Promoted from Ligue B
 Rusizi 
 Les Lierres
 Musongati

Relegated from Ligue A
 Les Crocos
 Les Jeunes Athlétiques
 Les Eléphants

Other changes
 Olympic Muremera was renamed as Ngozi City FC.

League table

References

Burundi Premier League seasons
Premier League
Premier League
Burundi